The 2001 Saint Francis Red Flash football team represented Saint Francis University as a member of the Northeast Conference (NEC) during the 2001 NCAA Division I-AA football season. The Red Flash were led by third-year head coach Dave Jaumotte and played its home games at the Pine Bowl. They finished the season 0–10 overall and 0–7 in NEC play to place last. Saint Francis' September 15 game against  was canceled due to college football's collective decision to postpone games following the September 11 attacks.

After the season, Jaumotte resigned after compiling a 2–30 record over three seasons.

Schedule

References

Saint Francis
Saint Francis Red Flash football seasons
College football winless seasons
Saint Francis Red Flash football